Marie Chamming's ( Krebs, 3 May 1923 – 15 February 2022) was a French writer and resistant.

Biography
The daughter of entrepreneur , Marie Henriette Françoise Krebs was born on 3 May 1923 in the 7th arrondissement of Paris. During World War II, she became a special liaison to Special Air Service Captain  while a part of the French Resistance. She met an SAS paratrooper, Georges Chamming's, whom she married at the Liberation of Paris. She then wrote J'ai choisi la tempête, for which she won the Prix Vérité in 1964.

Chamming's died on 15 February 2022, at the age of 98.

Distinctions
Resistance Medal (1946)
Prix Vérité (1964)
Knight of the Ordre National du Mérite (1972)
Officer of the National Order of the Legion of Honour (2020)

References

1923 births
2022 deaths
Writers from Paris
French women writers
French Resistance members
Knights of the Ordre national du Mérite
Officiers of the Légion d'honneur
Recipients of the Resistance Medal